Sara Fina Gutiérrez Tafoya (1863-1949) (sometimes spelled Serafina Tafoya) was a Tewa matriarch potter from Kha'po Owingeh (in Tewa: [xɑ̀ʔp’òː ʔówîŋgè]), New Mexico.

Tafoya is known for her minimally-adorned blackware and black-on-black ware, frequently marked with the imprint of a bear claw motif. She has been referred to as "undoubtedly the outstanding Tewa potter of her time." The Tafoya family lineage of Puebloan potters "goes as far back as records exist." Tafoya's work consisted primarily of large-scale vessels that were marked with concave and convex impressions and carved designs.

Personal life
Tafoya married Geronimo Tafoya with whom she had eight children. Many of her children, grand-children, great-grand children and extended family became well-known potters including Margaret Tafoya, LuAnn Tafoya, Tammy Garcia, Nathan Youngblood and others.

Collections
Her work is included in the collection of the Art Institute of Chicago, the Denver Art Museum, the Mount Hoyoke College Art Museum, the Nelson-Atkins Museum of Art, among other private and public collections.

Gallery

See also
 Black-on-black ware
 Pueblo pottery

References

Native American artists
1863 births
1949 deaths
Pueblo people
American potters
Artists from New Mexico
20th-century Native Americans
19th-century Native American women
20th-century Native American women